The Men's marathon athletics events for the 2016 Summer Paralympics took place in the streets of Rio de Janeiro on the 18 September. A total of three events were contested over this distance for three different disability classifications.

Medal summary

Results

T12
The T12 men's marathon was open to both T12 and T11 competitors, which are classifications for visually impaired athletes.

T46
The T46 men's marathon was open to T46 competitors only.

T54
The T54 men's marathon was open to both T54 and T53 competitors only.

References

Athletics at the 2016 Summer Paralympics
Summer Paralympics
Marathons at the Paralympics
Men's marathons
Marathons in Brazil
2016 in men's athletics